The Public Services Reform (Scotland) Act 2010 was an Act of the Scottish Parliament making changes to the organisation of public services in Scotland. Among other provisions, it set up the development body for the arts and creative industries Creative Scotland, and the inspectorate Social Care and Social Work Improvement Scotland, which now operates under the name of the Care Inspectorate.

References 

Acts of the Scottish Parliament 2010
Reform in Scotland

 Dnc (Do Not Care)